Essendine railway station was a station in Essendine, Rutland. It was situated on the East Coast Main Line of the Great Northern Railway.

Overview
The main line and the station opened in 1853. The Stamford and Essendine Railway branch line to Stamford and the line to Bourne were opened in 1856 and 1860. Due to its status as a junction, it was served by some express trains as well as by stopping trains. For many years a commuter train left King's Cross at around 5pm and terminated at Essendine, before returning the next morning.
The Bourne branch closed in 1951. The Stamford branch closed in 1959 along with Essendine station itself and the Peterborough to Grantham local services. Peterborough to Grantham is the longest distance between adjacent stations in England.

The 'South' Signal-box at Essendine was enlarged, not long after it was built, and by the time the station closed, had well over a hundred levers. Many of these, however had become 'spare' by that time. About the first 21 or 22 were for working the Bourne Branch and some related sidings.

Record 

Taking place on the slight downwards grade of Stoke Bank south of Grantham on the East Coast Main Line, the highest speed was recorded at milepost 90¼, between Little Bytham and Essendine. It broke the German (DRG Class 05) 002's 1936 record of 124 mph (200.4 km/h).

Summary of former services

London services
In 1863 there were 5 services to London with a best time of 2 hours 30 min via the York - London train at 13.30. In April 1910 this had improved to 10 services, although some required a change at Peterborough, and the best time was 1 hour 46 mins via the Nottingham - London express at 08.54. By July 1922, this had reduced to 7 services, with the best time now being 2 hours 10 mins via the Leeds - London express at 10.10.
In 2009, it is possible to travel to London by public transport in under 2 hours. The fastest route is by bus to Stamford and then train to London, changing at Peterborough.

Train timetable for July 1922 
The table below shows the train departures from Essendine on weekdays in July 1922.

References

External links
 Photo of 'Bourne Bay' at Essendine'
  Bourne & Essendine timetable, 1860
 Brief history of Stamford railways

Disused railway stations in Rutland
Former Great Northern Railway stations
Railway stations in Great Britain opened in 1853
Railway stations in Great Britain closed in 1959
1852 establishments in England